Freedom is the 17th studio album by Canadian-American musician Neil Young, released on October 2, 1989. Freedom relaunched Young's career after a largely unsuccessful decade. After many arguments and a lawsuit, Young left Geffen Records in 1988 and returned to his original label, Reprise, with This Note's for You. Freedom brought about a new, critical and commercially successful album. It was released in the United States as an LP record, cassette tape, and CD in 1989.

Production
Very different recording sessions made for a very eclectic album. Three songs ("Don't Cry," "Eldorado" and "On Broadway") had previously been released on the Japan and Australia-only EP Eldorado. Two other songs ("Crime in the City" and "Someday") had been recorded in 1988 with the rhythm-and-blues-oriented Bluenotes band from Young's previous album, This Note's for You. Young explains the wide array of music in the album thus: "I knew that I wanted to make a real album that expressed how I felt. I just wanted to make a Neil Young record per se. Something that was just me, where there was no persona, no image, no distinctive character like the Bluenotes guy or the guy in Everybody's Rockin'. It's the first time I've felt like doing an album like this in years." Although he originally planned to release a purely electric rock album ("nothing but abrasiveness from beginning to end"), Young says the final product is "almost like listening to the radio - it keeps changing and going from one thing to another."

"Rockin' in the Free World" became one of Young's signature songs and a live favorite, and bookends the album in acoustic and electric variants, a stylistic choice previously featured on Rust Never Sleeps. An edited cut of the electric version of the song was used over the final credits of Michael Moore's film Fahrenheit 9/11 and the song was re-released as a single at the time of the film's release.

Reception

Freedom has received mainly positive reviews, especially in comparison to the rest of Young's '80s work. AllMusic's William Ruhlmann rated the album four-and-a-half out of five stars, explaining that it "was the album Neil Young fans knew he was capable of making, but feared he would never make again." He also stated that "there were tracks that harked back to [his] acoustic-based, country-tinged albums." Robert Christgau, writing for The Village Voice, rated it an A. He declared that it contains a combination of "the folk ditties and rock galumph that made (Young) famous" and "the Nashvillisms and horn charts that made him infamous." He also said "it features a bunch of good stuff about a subject almost no rocker white or black has done much with--crack". David Fricke of Rolling Stone rated it five out of five stars. He called it "the sound of Neil Young, another decade on, looking back again in anger and dread" and that it is about "the illusion of freedom" and "Young's refusal to accept that as the last word on the subject." Fricke summed up the review by calling it "a harsh reminder that everything still comes with a price."

AllMusic reviewer Matthew Greenwald offered strong praise for the second track, "Crime in the City," calling it "undoubtedly the centerpiece of the album," "cinematic in scope" and "one of Neil Young's most accomplished works".
The album is ranked number 996 in All-Time Top 1000 Albums (3rd. edition, 2000).

Track listing

Personnel
 Neil Young – vocals; acoustic guitar; electric guitar; harmonica; piano on 9
 Chad Cromwell – drums
 Rick "The Bass Player" Rosas – bass
 Frank "Poncho" Sampedro – guitar on 2, 5 (as "Poncho Villa"), 9, 12; keyboards on 5, 7; mandolin on 11; vocals on 12
 Ben Keith – alto saxophone on 2, 7; pedal steel guitar on 2, 6, 11; keyboards on 10, 12; vocals on 11

Additional personnel

 Linda Ronstadt – vocals on 4, 6
 Tony Marsico – bass on 10
 Steve Lawrence – tenor saxophone on 2, 7
 Larry Cragg – baritone saxophone on 2, 7
 Claude Cailliet – trombone on 2, 7
 John Fumo – trumpet on 2, 7
 Tom Bray – trumpet on 2, 7

Production

 Neil Young – producer, mixing engineer
 Niko Bolas – producer, recording engineer except on tracks 1 4, mixing engineer except on tracks 1 4
 Tim Mulligan – digital engineer, recording engineer on 4
 Harry Sitam – senior technical engineer
 Dave Collins – digital editor
 Doug Sax – digital mastering engineer
 Dave Hewitt – recording engineer on 1, mixing engineer on 1

Charts
Weekly charts

Singles

Certifications

References

Neil Young albums
1989 albums
Reprise Records albums
Albums produced by Niko Bolas
Albums produced by Neil Young